Astros were first launched in 1997 by Cadbury in the United Kingdom, Canada, Ireland, the United States and South Africa as a rival to Nestlé Smarties, and Mars M&M's in the US. The confectionery can be described as a candy coated chocolate with a biscuit centre. They have since been discontinued in the UK, but are still sold in South Africa, and are available in 40g and 150g boxes. In Australia, they were marketed as Lunas.

See also

 List of chocolate bar brands

Notes and references

External links
 Independent, The (London),  Aug 7, 1997  by Nigel Cope
 Cadbury-Schweppes Find a Brand

Cadbury brands
Products introduced in 1997
Mondelez International brands